The Division of Hunter is an Australian electoral division in the state of New South Wales. The division was proclaimed in 1900, and was one of the original 65 divisions to be contested at the first federal election. The division was named after Captain John Hunter, the second Governor of New South Wales. It covers rural, regional and suburban areas centered on the Hunter Region, including the towns of Singleton, Muswellbrook and Cessnock. It also extends into parts of Greater Newcastle, covering suburbs such as Cameron Park, Edgeworth, Toronto and Morisset.

Hunter is a largely blue-collar electorate. Hunter's economic base includes agriculture and mining, being dominated by a mix of rural and coal mining communities. The Hunter Region is one of the few remaining Labor-voting regional areas of New South Wales.

The current member since the 2022 federal election, is Daniel Repacholi, a member of the Australian Labor Party.

Geography
Since 1984, federal electoral division boundaries in Australia have been determined at redistributions by a redistribution committee appointed by the Australian Electoral Commission. Redistributions occur for the boundaries of divisions in a particular state, and they occur every seven years, or sooner if a state's representation entitlement changes or when divisions of a state are malapportioned.

History

The seat has been in Labor hands since 1910, and for most of that time has been reasonably safe for that party. The Hunter Region has been one of the few areas outside of capital cities where Labor has consistently done well. Among its notable members have been first Prime Minister, Sir Edmund Barton, former Labor Leaders Matthew Charlton and Dr H.V. Evatt, and Joel Fitzgibbon, who was a minister in the first and second Rudd governments.

The seat has been held by two father-son combinations. Rowley James held the seat from 1928 to 1958 before giving it up for Evatt, who was in danger of losing his Sydney-area seat of Barton and wanted a friendlier seat in which to run. Evatt was succeeded after one term by Rowley James' son, Bert, who held it until 1980. Eric Fitzgibbon won the seat in 1984, handing it to his son, Joel, in 1996.

Two-party vote count
Hunter had become somewhat marginal in the 1980s when much of its territory was shifted to the newly created Charlton. Since 1990, Labor has never tallied less than 53 percent of the two-party-preferred vote. Labor's worst two-party-preferred vote was 52.4% in 1984 and best result when challenged by an opposing center-right candidate was 80.6% in 1961.

First-preference vote count
Labor's worst first-preference vote was in 2019, when the current member won only 37.5% of the primary vote; the previous 100-year worst being 44.5% in 2013, again by the incumbent member. Labor's best primary vote was a thumping 76.9% in 1946. As of 2019, the Division of Hunter is considered a marginal seat.

2015 proposed abolition
In 2015 the Australian Electoral Commission announced plans to abolish the federation seat of Hunter. Due to changing populations, overall, New South Wales was to lose a seat while Western Australia was to gain an extra seat. Electors in the north of Hunter were to join New England. The roughly 40 percent remainder were to become part of Paterson, with the Liberal margin calculated to be notionally reduced from 9.8 percent to just 0.5 percent as a result. Since the Commission's guidelines require it to preserve the names of original electorates where possible, the commission proposed renaming Charlton to Hunter. Effectively, this meant that Charlton was abolished, and Hunter pushed slightly eastward to absorb much of Charlton's former territory. Most voters of the new Hunter came from the former Charlton. However, Charlton's Labor incumbent, Pat Conroy, brokered a factional deal to contest neighbouring Shortland in order to allow Fitzgibbon to continue to represent the new Hunter.

Members

Election results

References

External links
 Division of Hunter - Australian Electoral Commission

Electoral divisions of Australia
Constituencies established in 1901
1901 establishments in Australia